

et

eta
etacepride (INN)
etacrynic acid (INN)
etafedrine (INN)
etafenone (INN)
etalocib (USAN)
etamicastat (INN)
etaminile (INN)
etamiphylline (INN)
etamivan (INN)
etamocycline (INN)
etamsylate (INN)
etanercept
etanidazole (INN)
etanterol (INN)
etaqualone (INN)
etaracizumab (USAN, INN)
etarotene (INN)
etasuline (INN)
etazepine (INN)
etazolate (INN)

ete
etebenecid (INN)
eteplirsen (INN)
eterobarb (INN)
etersalate (INN)

eth

etha-ethr
ethacridine (INN)
ethambutol (INN)
Ethamide
Ethamolin (QOL Medical)
ethanol (IUPAC)
ethaverine (INN)
ethchlorvynol (INN)
ethenzamide (INN)
ethinamate (INN)
ethinylestradiol (INN)
ethiodized oil (131 I) (INN)
Ethiodol (Savage Laboratories)
ethionamide (INN)
ethisterone (INN)
Ethmozine (Shire)
ethoheptazine (INN)
ethomoxane (INN)
ethosuximide (INN)
ethotoin (INN)
ethoxazorutoside (INN)
Ethrane
Ethril

ethy
ethyl biscoumacetate (INN)
ethyl carfluzepate (INN)
ethyl cartrizoate (INN)
ethyl dibunate (INN)
ethyl dirazepate (INN)
ethylestrenol (INN)
ethyl loflazepate (INN)
ethylmethylthiambutene (INN)
ethynerone (INN)
Ethyol
Ethyol (US Bioscience)
ethypicone (INN)

eti
etibendazole (INN)
eticlopride (INN)
eticyclidine (INN)
etidocaine (INN)
etidronic acid (INN)
etifelmine (INN)
etifenin (INN)
etifoxine (INN)
etilamfetamine (INN)
etilefrine pivalate (INN)
etilefrine (INN)
etilevodopa (USAN)
etintidine (INN)
etipirium iodide (INN)
etiprednol dicloacetate (USAN)
etiproston (INN)
etiracetam (INN)
etiroxate (INN)
etisazole (INN)
etisomicin (INN)
etisulergine (INN)
etizolam (INN)

eto

etoc-eton
etocarlide (INN)
etocrilene (INN)
etodolac (INN)
etodroxizine (INN)
etofamide (INN)
etofenamate (INN)
etofenprox (INN)
etofibrate (INN)
etoformin (INN)
etofuradine (INN)
etofylline clofibrate (INN)
etofylline (INN)
etoglucid (INN)
etolorex (INN)
etolotifen (INN)
etoloxamine (INN)
etomidate (INN)
etomidoline (INN)
etomoxir (INN)
etonam (INN)
etonitazene (INN)
etonogestrel (INN)

etop-etoz
etoperidone (INN)
Etopophos (Bristol-Myers Squibb)
etoposide (INN)
etoprindole (INN)
etorphine (INN)
etosalamide (INN)
etoxadrol (INN)
etoxazene (INN)
etoxeridine (INN)
etozolin (INN)

etr-ety
etrabamine (INN)
Etrafon
etravirine (USAN)
etretinate (INN)
etryptamine (INN)
etybenzatropine (INN)
etymemazine (INN)
etynodiol (INN)